The following events occurred in October 1953:

October 1, 1953 (Thursday)
The Andhra State Act is passed in India, creating Andhra State from Telugu-speaking areas of the state of Madras. Sir Chandulal Madhavlal Trivedi is appointed governor of the new state.
The United States and South Korea sign a mutual defense treaty in Washington, D.C.
Born: Grete Waitz, Norwegian marathon runner, in Oslo, as Grete Andersen (died 2011)

October 2, 1953 (Friday)
Died: John Marin, 82, US modernist artist

October 3, 1953 (Saturday)
The 1953 Ryder Cup golf tournament, held at Wentworth Club in Virginia Water, Surrey, UK, ends in a sixth consecutive victory for the United States. 
Born: Karen Bass, American politician, Mayor of Los Angeles, in Los Angeles
Died: 
Sir Arnold Bax, 69, English composer and writer, Master of the Queen's Music, of heart failure
Rosario Candela, Italian-American architect (b. 1890)

October 4, 1953 (Sunday)
Born: 
Tchéky Karyo, French actor and musician, in Istanbul, Turkey, under the name Baruch Djaki Karyo
Andreas Vollenweider, Swiss harpist, in Zürich

October 5, 1953 (Monday)
 Earl Warren is appointed Chief Justice of the United States by U.S. President Dwight D. Eisenhower.
 Wilhelm Furtwängler makes a public protest, jointly with the soloists in the Vienna State Opera's production of Don Giovanni against the suspension of Egon Hilbert as director of the State Opera.
 The first meeting of Narcotics Anonymous is held (the first planning session was held August 17).

October 6, 1953 (Tuesday)
 UNICEF, the United Nations Children's Fund, is made a permanent specialized agency of the United Nations.
The UK government sends troops to deal with unrest in the colony of British Guiana; Communists are blamed.
Died: Vera Mukhina, 64, Soviet sculptor and painter, of angina

October 7, 1953 (Wednesday)
Died Emil Filla, 71, Moravian avant-garde painter, Buchenwald survivor

October 8, 1953 (Thursday)
Died: Kathleen Ferrier, 41, English contralto singer, of breast cancer

October 9, 1953 (Friday)
 West German federal election: Konrad Adenauer is re-elected as Chancellor of Germany.
 The British Guiana constitution is suspended.
In a papal address, Pope Pius XII delivers "The Technician", a document instructing scientists to restrict themselves to the study of physical matter and do nothing to undermine the idea of a non-material soul or a Superior Being.
Born: Tony Shalhoub, American actor, in Green Bay, Wisconsin

October 10, 1953 (Saturday)
 British pilot Monty Burton wins the 1953 London to Christchurch air race (held to celebrate the centenary of the city of Christchurch, New Zealand) in under 23 hours flying time.
In the final of the 1953 Soviet Cup football tournament, FC Dynamo Moscow defeat Zenit Kuibyshev.
 The Mutual Defense Treaty Between the United States and the Republic of Korea is concluded in Washington, D.C.
Born: Midge Ure, Scottish singer-songwriter, in Cambuslang, as James Ure

October 11, 1953 (Sunday)
Died: Pauline Robinson Bush, 3, daughter of future US President George H. W. Bush and his wife Barbara, from leukemia.

October 12, 1953 (Monday)
In the Norwegian parliamentary election, the Labour Party wins 77 of the 150 seats in the Storting.
 Primate of Poland Stefan Wyszyński, imprisoned by the Communist government, is relocated from Rywałd to Stoczek Klasztorny.
Three ministers from the Malta Workers Party resign from Giorgio Borġ Olivier's coalition government following a defeat in the Legislative Assembly on a budget motion. This leads to the dissolution of Parliament and a general election.
The 29th FA Charity Shield football match is played at Highbury Stadium, London, UK, and is won by Arsenal F.C. over Blackpool F.C..
 The British cargo ship Beckenham runs aground and breaks in two in the Kara Sea, Soviet Union. The crew members are rescued by a Soviet ship.

October 13, 1953 (Tuesday)
 Herman Wouk's play The Caine Mutiny Court-Martial, adapted from his own novel, is premièred at the Granada Theatre in Santa Barbara, California, United States.

October 14, 1953 (Wednesday)
1953 Sabena Convair CV-240 crash: A Convair CV-240 operated by Sabena crashes shortly after take-off from Frankfurt International Airport in West Germany, on a flight to Brussels, Belgium; all 44 people on board are killed.
A municipal election is held in the Canadian city of Edmonton to elect six aldermen.</ref>

October 15, 1953 (Thursday)
Born: Larry Miller, American comedian

October 16, 1953 (Friday)
Cuban revolutionary and future leader Fidel Castro delivers one of his most famous speeches, "History Will Absolve Me", and is sentenced to 15 years' imprisonment by the existing government for leading an attack on the Moncada Barracks.

October 17, 1953 (Saturday)

October 18, 1953 (Sunday)
Peter Brook's live television production of Shakespeare's King Lear, starring Orson Welles as Lear, is broadcast in the United States as part of the CBS television series Omnibus, hosted by Alistair Cooke.
Born: Georgi Raykov, Bulgarian Olympic wrestler, in Sofia

October 19, 1953 (Monday)
During a domestic flight from Aeropuerto del Norte outside Monterrey to the Nueva Ciudad Guerrero airstrip, carrying guests to the inauguration of the Falcon Dam, a Pemex Douglas DC-3 crashes into a ravine near Mamulique, Mexico, killing all 15 people on board.
 The La Rosa Incident: Arthur Godfrey, one of America's top media personalities, fires singer Julius La Rosa on the air, an event that draws considerable attention, causes some shock and results in significant criticism of Godfrey. The incident quickly alters public perception of Godfrey, materially damaging his career.
The Miss World 1953 competition is held in London, UK, and is won by Denise Perrier, Miss France.

October 20, 1953 (Tuesday)
German Chancellor Konrad Adenauer's second cabinet is sworn in.

October 21, 1953 (Wednesday)
British actor Sir John Gielgud is fined for "persistently importuning male persons for an immoral purpose" (cottaging) in Chelsea, London.

October 22, 1953 (Thursday)
 Under the Treaty of Amity and Association, France recognises the independence of the Kingdom of Laos.
In the Northern Ireland general election, the Ulster Unionist Party wins a large majority. Basil Brooke continues as Prime Minister.
The Japanese tanker Eiho Maru runs aground three times within 24 hours, in the River Mersey, United Kingdom.

October 23, 1953 (Friday)
 Alto Broadcasting System in the Philippines makes the first television broadcast in southeast Asia through DZAQ-TV. Alto Broadcasting System (ABS) is the predecessor of what would later become ABS-CBN Corporation after being bought by the Chronicle Broadcasting Network (CBN) in 1957.
 The RFA Eddyreef coastal tanker enters service with the UK's Royal Fleet Auxiliary.

October 24, 1953 (Saturday)
 In the 1953 Scottish League Cup Final, held in Glasgow, East Fife F.C. defeat Partick Thistle F.C. 3–2

October 25, 1953 (Sunday)
The US-registered fishing vessel Sea Gram is destroyed by fire at Saltery Bay in the Tenakee Inlet in Southeast Alaska.

October 26, 1953 (Monday)
Passenger service ends on the Pacific Electric Santa Monica Air Line in the United States.

October 27, 1953 (Tuesday)
The life-boat Robert Lindsay, based in Arbroath, Scotland, capsizes after being hit by a huge wave and flung onto rocks at Inchcape Park. Six crew members are killed.
Egon Hilbert resigns from his position as director of the Vienna State Opera.

October 28, 1953 (Wednesday)
U.S. sports commentator Red Barber leaves the Brooklyn Dodgers baseball team to join the New York Yankees.

October 29, 1953 (Thursday)
U.S. Air Force pilot Frank K. "Speedy Pete" Everest  sets a new world speed record of 755.149 mph (1,216.021 km/hr) in a North American YF-100A Super Sabre, while stationed at Edwards Air Force Base, California.
BCPA Flight 304, operated by British Commonwealth Pacific Airlines, crashes while on initial approach to San Francisco International Airport in San Mateo County, California, United States, killing all 19 people on board. 
Died: William Kapell, 31, US pianist, a passenger in the fatal crash of BCPA Flight 304

October 30, 1953 (Friday)
 Cold War: U.S. President Dwight D. Eisenhower formally approves a top-secret document of the United States National Security Council, NSC 162/2, which states that the United States' arsenal of nuclear weapons must be maintained and expanded to counter the Communist threat (→ New Look).
Died: Alice Eastwood, 94, Canadian botanist

October 31, 1953 (Saturday)
In the 1953 Kahibah state by-election in the Australian state of New South Wales, brought about by the forced resignation of Labor MLA Joshua Arthur, independent candidate Tom Armstrong wins the seat.
In the 1953 Waverley state by-election in the Australian state of New South Wales, brought about by the death of Labor MLA Clarrie Martin, William Ferguson retains the seat for Labor.

References

1953
1953-10
1953-10